The Singaporean women's cricket team is the team that represents the country of Singapore in international women's cricket matches. They played their first match against Malaysia on 30 April 2006 and lost by 58 runs.

In April 2018, the International Cricket Council (ICC) granted full Women's Twenty20 International (WT20I) status to all its members. Therefore, all Twenty20 matches played between Singapore women and another international side since 1 July 2018 have been a full WT20I. Singapore made their Twenty20 International debut in the 2018 Saudari Cup against Malaysia in August 2018, winning two matches out of a six match series.

Tournaments History 

ACC Women’s Tournament 2007

-China vs Singapore : China won by 38 runs 
-Blangladesh vs Singapore : Blangladesh won by 10 wickets 
-UAE vs Singapore : Singapore won by 6 wickets

ACC U-19 Women’s Championship 2008

Singapore Came in 8th in this tournament.
-Against Bhutan : Bhutan won by 14 runs 
-Against China : Singapore won by 4 wickets 
-Against Nepal : Nepal won by 9 wickets 
-Against Kuwait : Singapore won by 5 wickets
-Against Malaysia : Malaysia won by 46 runs 
-Against UAE : UAE won by 17 runs

ACC Women’s Twenty20 Championship 2009

Singapore came in 5th out of 12 teams in this tournament after losing the semi final spot to Nepal because of the tie match which led to a bowl out loss.

-Against Thailand : Thailand won by 11 runs 
-Against Nepal : Match tied. Nepal won on bowl out 
-Against Iran : Singapore won by 25 runs 
-Against Qatar : Singapore won by 23 runs 
-Against Bhutan : Singapore won by 34 runs 
-Against Malaysia : Singapore won by 6 Wickets

Records and statistics
International Match Summary — Singapore Women
 
Last updated 12 February 2023

Twenty20 International 
 Highest team total: 127/5 (19.4 overs) v Malaysia on 10 August 2018 at Selangor Turf Club, Kuala Lumpur.
 Highest individual score: 77*, Diviya G K v Malaysia on 10 August 2018 at Selangor Turf Club, Kuala Lumpur.
 Best individual bowling figures: 3/8, Diviya G K v Malaysia on 11 August 2018 at Selangor Turf Club, Kuala Lumpur.

T20I record versus other nations 

Records complete to WT20I #1358. Last updated 12 February 2023.

See also
List of Singapore women Twenty20 International cricketers

References

External links
Malaysian international fixtures in 2007
Report on first match
Official site of the Singapore Cricket Association

 
Cricket in Singapore
Women's national cricket teams
Women